The 1999 European Amateur Team Championship took place 29 June – 3 July at Golf Club Monticello  in Cassina Rizzardi, 5 kilometres south-west of the city center of Como, Lombardy region, Italy. It was the 21st men's golf European Amateur Team Championship.

Format 
Each team consisted of six players, playing two rounds of an opening stroke-play qualifying competition over two days, counting the five best scores each day for each team.

The eight best teams formed flight A, in knock-out match-play over the next three days. The teams were seeded based on their positions after the stroke play. The first placed team were drawn to play the quarter final against the eight placed team, the second against the seventh, the third against the sixth and the fourth against the fifth. Teams were allowed to use six players during the team matches, selecting four of them in the two morning foursome games and five players in to the afternoon single games. Games all square at the 18th hole were declared halved, if the team match was already decided. The elimination matches and the bronze match were decided with one foursome game and four single games.

The eight teams placed 9–16 in the qualification stroke-play formed flight B and the six teams placed 17–22 formed flight C, to play similar knock-out play, with one foursome game and four single games in each match, to decide their final positions.

Teams 
22 nation teams contested the event. Each team consisted of six players.

Players in the leading teams

Other participating teams

Winners 
Team France won the opening 36-hole competition, with a 19-ounder-par score of 701, 10 strokes ahead of eight-time-winners England on 2nd place. Neither four-times-champions Scotland or two-times-champions Sweden did make it to the quarter finals, finishing tied ninth.

There was no official award for the lowest individual score, but individual leader was Sebastian Branger, France, with an 8-under-par score of 136, one stroke ahead of Lorne Kelly, Scotland.

Host nation Italy won the gold medal, earning their first title, beating team Germany in the final 4–3.

Team France earned the bronze on third place, after beating England 3–2 in the bronze match.

Results 
Qualification round

Team standings

* Note: In the event of a tie the order was determined by the best total of the two non-counting scores of the two rounds.

Individual leaders

 Note: There was no official award for the lowest individual score.

Flight A

Bracket

Final games

Flight B

Bracket

Flight C

Bracket

Final standings

Sources:

See also 

 Eisenhower Trophy – biennial world amateur team golf championship for men organized by the International Golf Federation.
 European Ladies' Team Championship – European amateur team golf championship for women organised by the European Golf Association.

References

External links 
European Golf Association: Full results

European Amateur Team Championship
Golf tournaments in Italy
European Amateur Team Championship
European Amateur Team Championship
European Amateur Team Championship
European Amateur Team Championship